Jeroen van Wijngaarden (born 29 March 1978) is a Dutch politician who has served as a member of the House of Representatives since 2019, previously holding a seat from 2014 to 2017. He is a member of the People's Party for Freedom and Democracy (VVD).

Early life and career
Van Wijngaarden was born on 29 March 1978 in Amsterdam. He studied change and personnel management at the Hotelschool The Hague between 1996 and 2000. He studied journalism, media and culture for one year at Cardiff University between 2002 and 2003. This was followed up by a study of Dutch law at the University of Amsterdam from 2006 to 2011. Van Wijngaarden worked in communication and public affairs for several years, including as manager at PricewaterhouseCoopers between 2011 and 2014.

Political career

Career in local politics
Van Wijngaarden served as member of the borough council of Amsterdam-Zuid from May 2007 until April 2014, including four years as party group leader.

Member of the House of Representatives
On 1 July 2014 Van Wijngaarden became member of the House of Representatives for the first time when he replaced Cora van Nieuwenhuizen, who became Member of the European Parliament. His term in the House ended after the 2017 general election. 

Van Wijngaarden was re-admitted as member on 20 February 2019 when he succeeded Foort van Oosten, who resigned to assume the mayorship of Nissewaard.

In addition to his committee assignments, Van Wijngaarden has been a member of the Dutch delegation to the Parliamentary Assembly of the Council of Europe (PACE) since 2022. In the Assembly, he serves on the Committee on Political Affairs and Democracy.

References

1978 births
Living people
21st-century Dutch politicians
Dutch public relations people
Members of the House of Representatives (Netherlands)
Politicians from Amsterdam
People's Party for Freedom and Democracy politicians
University of Amsterdam alumni
20th-century Dutch people